He Winked and Won is a 1916 American comedy film directed by and starring Oliver Hardy.

Cast
 Oliver Hardy as Babe (as Babe Hardy)
 Kate Price as Kate
 Ethel Marie Burton as Ethel (as Ethel Burton)
 Florence McLaughlin as Florence (as Florence McLoughlin)

See also
 List of American films of 1916

External links

1916 films
1916 short films
American silent short films
American black-and-white films
1916 comedy films
Films directed by Oliver Hardy
Silent American comedy films
American comedy short films
1910s American films
1910s English-language films